Arnór Ingvi Traustason (born 30 April 1993) is an Icelandic professional footballer who plays for Swedish club IFK Norrköping as a midfielder.

Club career
While at Keflavik, Arnór Ingvi was named as the most promising player of the 2013 Úrvalsdeild after the season by his fellow Úrvalsdeild players.

Arnór Ingvi was signed to IFK Norrköping, and won the 2015 Swedish title with the club.

Arnór Ingvi signed with Rapid Wien in the summer of 2016.

On 5 July 2017, AEK Athens announced the signing of Arnór Ingvi on a one-year loan deal with a purchase option of €1 million for the summer of 2018. On 26 October 2017, he scored his first goal for the club in 7–0 away win against Apollon Larissa for the Greek Cup.

He was officially set for release from the club on 4 December 2017 as his performances and work rate did not live up to the expectations of experienced Spanish manager Manolo Jimenez.
He made only five official performances with the club at the first part of 2017–18 season and signed a three and a half-year contract with Swedish club Malmö FF for an undisclosed fee.

In March 2021 he signed for American MLS team New England Revolution.

In August 2022 he returned to IFK Norrköping.

International career

Arnór Ingvi has represented Iceland at youth levels such as the under-17s, the under-19s and the under-21s.

He played for the under-21 side at the 2013 UEFA European Under-21 Football Championship qualification and the 2015 UEFA European Under-21 Football Championship qualification.

Arnór Ingvi made his senior debut for Iceland on 13 November 2015 in a 2–4 away defeat at the National Stadium against Poland. He was included in Heimir Hallgrímsson and Lars Lagerbäck's 23-man squad for the Euro 2016. On 22 June 2016, Arnór Ingvi scored the winning goal in a 2–1 victory over Austria as Iceland finished second in their Euro 2016 group, thus taking them to the Round of 16.

In May 2018 he was named in Iceland's 23 man-squad for the 2018 World Cup in Russia.

Career statistics

International

Scores and results list Iceland's goal tally first, score column indicates score after each Arnór Ingvi goal.

Honours
IFK Norrköping
Allsvenskan: 2015

References

External links
 
 

1993 births
Living people
Arnor Ingvi Traustason
Arnor Ingvi Traustason
Association football midfielders
Arnor Ingvi Traustason
Arnor Ingvi Traustason
Arnor Ingvi Traustason
UEFA Euro 2016 players
2018 FIFA World Cup players
Arnor Ingvi Traustason
Major League Soccer players
Eliteserien players
Allsvenskan players
Austrian Football Bundesliga players
Super League Greece players
Arnor Ingvi Traustason
Sandnes Ulf players
IFK Norrköping players
SK Rapid Wien players
AEK Athens F.C. players
Malmö FF players
New England Revolution players
Arnor Ingvi Traustason
Arnor Ingvi Traustason
Expatriate footballers in Norway
Arnor Ingvi Traustason
Expatriate footballers in Austria
Arnor Ingvi Traustason
Expatriate footballers in Sweden
Arnor Ingvi Traustason
Expatriate footballers in Greece
Arnor Ingvi Traustason
Expatriate soccer players in the United States